Thomas Gregory Clements Jr. (born March 28, 1969) is an American politician who served as a member of the Michigan House of Representatives from the 56th district. Elected in 2020, he assumed office on January 1, 2021 and left office on December 31, 2022.

Early life and education
Clements was born on March 28, 1969 in Bartow, Florida. Clements earned an associate degree from Polk State College. In 2007, Clements earned a bachelor's degree from Flagler College.

Career
Clements has served as deputy chief of police of Eliot, Maine. Clements is the franchise owner of the travel agency Premier Cruise Planners. As of 2020, Clements was a member trustee of Bedford Township, Michigan. On November 3, Clements was elected to the Michigan House of Representatives. He was sworn in on December 13, 2020, and assumed office on January 1, 2021. There, he represented the 56th district. In 2022, Clements was defeated by Joseph Bellino in the Republican primary for the 16th state senate district.

Personal life
Clements is married to Jamie. Together, they have three children. Clements is a member of the National Rifle Association. Clements is Lutheran. Clements resides in Temperance.

References

Living people
American Lutherans
Flagler College alumni
Lutherans from Michigan
Republican Party members of the Michigan House of Representatives
People from Bartow, Florida
People from Eliot, Maine
People from Monroe County, Michigan
Polk State College alumni
21st-century American politicians
1969 births